"Ill Wind (You're Blowin' Me No Good)" is a song composed by Harold Arlen with lyrics by Ted Koehler. It was written for their last show at the Cotton Club in 1934 and was sung by Adelaide Hall In an interview, Adelaide Hall explained how she performed the song to great effect during the show:

The melody came to Arlen while he was visiting Anya Taranda, then a model who later became his wife.

The song is also featured in the 1984 Francis Ford Coppola movie The Cotton Club sung by the actress Lonette McKee. McKee plays a character with similarities to Adelaide Hall in real life.

Notable recordings
 Maxine Sullivan (1939)
 Lena Horne - Moanin' Low (1942)
 Frank Sinatra - In the Wee Small Hours (1955)
 Dinah Washington - Dinah! (1956)
 Ben Webster - Soulville (1957)
 Ella Fitzgerald - Ella at the Opera House (1958), Ella Fitzgerald Sings the Harold Arlen Songbook (1961)
 Horace Silver - Further Explorations (1958)
 Stan Kenton - Standards in Silhouette (1959)
 Howard McGhee - Sharp Edge (1961)
 Sarah Vaughan - After Hours (1961), Send in the Clowns (1981)
 Earl Grant - Midnight Sun (1962)
 Lee Morgan - Cornbread (1967)
 Larry Coryell/Emily Remler - Together (1985)
 Australian recording artist Kate Ceberano - Kate Ceberano and her Septet (1986)
 Adelaide Hall - Live at the Riverside Studios (Riverside Studios) (Jay Productions Ltd./TER Ltd. CDVIR 8312, 1990)
 Michael Brook featuring Michael Stipe, Jimmy Scott, and Flea - Albino Alligator soundtrack (1997)
 June Christy - A Friendly Session, Vol. 1 (2000) with the Johnny Guarnieri Quintet
 Audra McDonald - Happy Songs (2002)
 Mina - Mina per Wind (Vol.2) (2002)
 Debbie Harry (in a medley with "Stormy Weather") - Hal Willner's Stormy Weather: The Music of Harold Arlen (2003)
 Patti LuPone - The Lady with the Torch (2006)
 Noisettes - Wild Young Hearts (2009)
 Johnny Dankworth - Too Cool for the Blues (2010)
 Norah Jones with the Charlie Haden Quartet West - Sophisticated Ladies (2010)

External links
 lyric
 JazzStandards.com: Song Information

References

Songs with music by Harold Arlen
Pop standards
Songs with lyrics by Ted Koehler
Ella Fitzgerald songs
Lena Horne songs
1934 songs